The Bobs is a "new wave" a cappella singing group from San Francisco, California

The Bobs may also refer to:
 The Bobs (album), the self-titled 1983 debut recording of the a cappella group
 The Bobs (roller coaster), a wooden roller coaster built in 1924 at Riverview Park in Chicago
 The BOBs (weblog award), an international Weblog competition founded and sponsored by Deutsche Welle
 "the Bobs", a pair of characters in the 1999 film Office Space
 Thunderbolt (Savin Rock), a roller coaster formerly known as "The Bobs".